Carol-Ann James is a Trinidadian former cricketer who played as an all-rounder, batting right-handed and bowling right-arm off break. She appeared in 11 One Day Internationals for the West Indies between 1993 and 1997. She played domestic cricket for Trinidad and Tobago.

References

External links

Living people
West Indian women cricketers
West Indies women One Day International cricketers
Trinidad and Tobago women cricketers
Year of birth missing (living people)
Date of birth missing (living people)